Life Goes On (reissued in 1944 as His Harlem Wife) is a 1938 crime drama directed by William Nolte and starring Louise Beavers, Edward Thompson, Reginald Fenderson, and Laurence Criner. It was produced by Million Dollar Productions, which created race films with African-American casts for distribution to "colored only" theaters during the years of segregation.

The Library of Congress has a movie poster promoting Life Goes On that features inset images of Laurence Criner and Louise Beavers.

Plot summary
A mother raises two sons. One becomes a lawyer and the other a criminal.

Cast
Louise Beavers as Sally Weston
Edward Thompson as Bob Weston
Reginald Fenderson as Henry Weston, aka Monte Howard
Laurence Criner as Bull Connors
Monte Hawley as District Attorney
Hope Bennet as Betty

References

External links

1938 films
Race films
American crime drama films
1938 crime drama films
American black-and-white films
1930s English-language films
1930s American films